The Journal of Asthma and Allergy is a peer-reviewed medical journal focusing on asthma and pulmonary physiology. The journal was established in 2008 and is published by Dove Medical Press.

External links 
 

English-language journals
Open access journals
Dove Medical Press academic journals
Pulmonology journals
Publications established in 2008